Samuel J. F. Thayer (1842–1893) was an American architect, notable for designing buildings such as the Providence City Hall and the Cathedral of St. George, as well as the town halls of Brookline, Stoughton, and Methuen, Massachusetts.

Biography
Thayer studied under John D. Towle. He lived for a time in South Boston, Massachusetts, and enlisted in the 5th Regiment Massachusetts Volunteers during the American Civil War, serving from October 1862 to July 1863.

After the war, Thayer collaborated briefly with Boston architect Abel C. Martin, forming the firm Martin & Thayer. This firm designed the Centenary Methodist Church in Stanstead, Quebec, a Gothic Revival structure, in 1866–69. In 1867 they designed a large summer hotel on Lake Memphremagog, Quebec near the American border.

By 1869 the partnership with Martin had ended, and both opened separate offices. Thayer then went on to design the Town Hall of Brookline, Massachusetts, Providence City Hall in 1878, and the Dartmouth College library in 1885.

He shot himself in a fit of despondency, dying on February 28, 1893. He had been "in ill health for some time," and reportedly had money troubles. He left behind a suicide note, along with a wife and son.

Notable works

References

External links

 

19th-century American architects
Architects from Boston
Union Army soldiers
People from South Boston
Suicides by firearm in Massachusetts
1842 births
1893 deaths
1890s suicides